A schistosomicide is a drug used to combat schistosomiasis.

List
Examples listed in MeSH include:
 amoscanate
 arteether
 artemether
 chloroxylenol
 hycanthone
 lucanthone
 metrifonate
 niridazole
 oltipraz
 oxamniquine
 praziquantel
 stibophen

See also 
 Schistosomiasis vaccine

References

Further reading 
 

Antiparasitic agents
Lists of drugs